Prince Abedi Adolphus (born August 21, 1985) is a Nigerian footballer who plays as a winger.

External links
 
 

Living people
1985 births
Sportspeople from Port Harcourt
Nigerian footballers
Nigerian expatriate footballers
Expatriate footballers in Bulgaria
Expatriate footballers in Lebanon
Expatriate footballers in Kuwait
Expatriate footballers in Libya
PFC Naftex Burgas players
Salam Zgharta FC players
Al Ansar FC players
Al Tadhamon SC players
Al-Yarmouk SC (Kuwait) players
Darnes SC players
Association football forwards
Nigerian expatriate sportspeople in Lebanon
Lebanese Premier League players
Nigerian expatriate sportspeople in Kuwait
Nigerian expatriate sportspeople in Oman
Nigerian expatriate sportspeople in Libya
Expatriate footballers in Oman
Majees SC players
Al-Nasr SC (Salalah) players
Libyan Premier League players